Tokodede (also known as Tukude, Tocodede, Tokodé, and Tocod) is one of the languages of East Timor, spoken by about 39,000 people in the municipality of Liquiçá, especially the administrative posts of Maubara and Liquiçá along the northern reaches of the Loes River system. The number of speakers has declined in recent years. It is a Malayo-Polynesian language in the Timor group.

The Tokodede version was published in the literary supplement Várzea de Letras, published by the Department of Portuguese Language of the National University of Timor-Leste, in Dili, in December 2005.

References

External links
 Peneer meselo laa Literatura kidia-laa Timór, the first significant text published in Tocodede
 John 8,1-11 in Tokodede
  Tokodede dictionary on-line

Timor–Babar languages
Languages of East Timor